Alicia Jane Lucas  (née Quirk; born 28 March 1992) is a former professional Australian rugby union player. She represented  in international rugby sevens and won a gold medal at the 2016 Summer Olympics in Rio.

Biography 
Lucas was born in Wagga Wagga, New South Wales. She played for The Tribe at a club level. Lucas debuted for the Australian sevens team in May 2013. She also represented Australia in Touch Football, and was part of the team which won the 2011 Touch World Cup. She studied for a Bachelor of Physiotherapy at Charles Sturt University, Albury-Wodonga, graduating in 2013. Lucas representative honours also include ACT.

Lucas was a member of  Australia's women's sevens team at the 2016 Summer Olympics, defeating New Zealand in the final to win the inaugural Olympic gold medal in the sport.

Lucas announced her retirement from rugby union and sevens in August 2022.

References

External links
 
 
 
 

1992 births
Australian female rugby union players
Australian female rugby sevens players
Australia international rugby sevens players
Living people
Rugby sevens players at the 2016 Summer Olympics
Olympic rugby sevens players of Australia
Touch footballers
Olympic gold medalists for Australia
Olympic medalists in rugby sevens
Medalists at the 2016 Summer Olympics
Commonwealth Games medallists in rugby sevens
Commonwealth Games silver medallists for Australia
Rugby sevens players at the 2018 Commonwealth Games
Recipients of the Medal of the Order of Australia
Medallists at the 2018 Commonwealth Games